The Roman Catholic Diocese of Djougou is a diocese located in the city of Djougou in the Ecclesiastical province of Cotonou in Benin.

History
 10 June 1995: Established as Diocese of Djougou from the Diocese of Natitingou

Leadership
 Bishops of Djougou (Roman rite)
 Bishop Bernard de Clairvaux Toha Wontacien, O.S.F.S.: 12 February 2022 - Present
 Bishop Paul Kouassivi Vieira: 1 October 1995  – 21 March 2019

See also
 Roman Catholicism in Benin

References

External links
 GCatholic.org 

Djougou
Christian organizations established in 1995
Roman Catholic dioceses and prelatures established in the 20th century
Djougou, Roman Catholic Diocese of
Roman Catholic bishops of Djougou